Abdoulaye Diarra (born 12 October 1986) is an Ivorian footballer who currently plays as  a midfielder for Liga IV side CS Glogovăț. Diarra grew up at Inter Milan and played at senior level for Maribor, Bohemians Prague and Viktorie Jirny before moving in 2011 to Romania where he played in the second and third tier for UTA Arad, FC Bihor, Millenium Giarmata and Gloria Lunca-Teuz Cermei.

Club career

Internazionale
At age 14, Diarra arrived in Italy. He began his career in Italy with Associazone Calcio Dilettanti Valnure Podenzano Vigolzone Bettola and was in July 2002 scouted from Internazionale. After five years with F.C. Internazionale Milano, in January 2007 on loan to NK Maribor until 30 June 2007 as part of Rene Krhin deal. He played at both legs of UEFA Intertoto Cup 2007 first round which is on 24 and 30 June.

As part of the deal of David Suazo, he was transferred to Cagliari in July 2007, along with Robert Acquafresca. Few weeks later he signed a 2-year deal with Maribor.

Bohemians Prague
On 1 July 2008 he was signed by Bohemians (Střížkov) Prague. In 2008–09 season he left on loan to SK Viktorie Jirny of Czech Republic Fourth Division Divize B (Group B), along with Mayola Biboko. He played two league match and 1 cup match before left on loan.

UTA
In September 2010 he was signed by UTA Arad.

International career
He was call-up to Ivory Coast national under-23 football team in 2007.

References

External links

 
 Stats from Slovenia at Prvaliga.

1986 births
Living people
Ivorian footballers
Ivorian expatriate footballers
Association football midfielders
Association football forwards
Slovenian PrvaLiga players
Inter Milan players
Expatriate footballers in Italy
NK Maribor players
Expatriate footballers in Slovenia
FK Bohemians Prague (Střížkov) players
Czech First League players
Expatriate footballers in the Czech Republic
Ivorian expatriate sportspeople in the Czech Republic
FC UTA Arad players
FC Bihor Oradea players
Expatriate footballers in Romania
People from Divo, Ivory Coast